Brevard Springs Childs (September 2, 1923 – June 23, 2007) was an American Old Testament scholar and Professor of Old Testament at Yale University from 1958 until 1999 (and Sterling Professor after 1992), who is considered one of the most influential biblical scholars of the 20th century.

Thought
Childs is particularly noted for pioneering the canonical approach, a way of interpreting the Bible that focuses on the text of the biblical canon itself as a finished product. In fact, Childs disliked the term, believing his work to represent an entirely new departure, replacing the entire historical-critical method. Childs set out his canonical approach in his Biblical Theology in Crisis (1970) and applied it in Introduction to the Old Testament as Scripture (1979). This latter book has been described as "one of the most discussed books of the 1980s".

Childs' influences included Karl Barth and Hermann Gunkel.

Christopher Seitz argues that 

Professor Childs single-handedly effected major and sustained changes in the conceptual framework of modern biblical studies through appeal to the canonical presentation of biblical books and the theological implications of attending to their final form.

Seitz has also noted that "there is a small cottage industry in evaluating the contribution of Brevard Childs." For example, John Barton writes about Childs' response to those who claimed that historical criticism "deliberately took away the Bible's religious claims in order to subject it to analysis". In Childs' canonical approach, writes Barton, "the interpreter of the Bible should not confront the biblical text as if it were a newly discovered document." To the contrary, as Barton reads Childs, "a properly theological reading of the Bible, by contrast, would treat it just as it stands as a vehicle of a living faith."

Education
Childs' formal education was interrupted during 1943-45 while he was serving in the United States Army during World War II. After being discharged, he continued his academic work at the University of Michigan.
B.A., M.A. - University of Michigan (1947)
B.D. - Princeton Theological Seminary (1950) 
Th.D. - University of Basel (1955)
In addition to his earned degrees, Childs was awarded an honorary Doctorate of Theology by the University of Aberdeen in 1981 and by the University of Glasgow in 1992.

Life
 

Most of Childs' professional life was spent in the United States, Germany and the United Kingdom. From 1958-1999, he was Professor of Old Testament at Yale University. In 2007, shortly after returning from his spring residence in the United Kingdom, Childs suffered a severe fall at his home in Connecticut from which he did not recover. He had continued writing and publishing until the end.

Childs was survived by his wife, Ann, and their children, Cathy and John.

Ellen Davis of Duke Divinity School studied under Childs and notes:

His scholarship was very fully integrated into his character, it would be very difficult to separate those two. He was a Christian. His work was a form of discipleship.

In 1990, a Festschrift was published in his honor. Canon, Theology, and Old Testament Interpretation: Essays in Honor of Brevard S. Childs included contributions from James Barr, John Van Seters, Ronald E. Clements, and James Luther Mays.

Works
In addition to the following books, during the 1955–2006 period, Childs wrote some eighty articles and reviews.

Books

References

See also
Theology of crisis

External links
 “The Life and Work of Brevard S. Childs”

1923 births
2007 deaths
People from Columbia, South Carolina
American biblical scholars
Old Testament scholars
University of Michigan alumni
Princeton Theological Seminary alumni
University of Basel alumni
Yale University faculty
Yale Sterling Professors